The Himalayan subtropical broadleaf forests is an ecoregion that extends from the middle hills of central Nepal through Darjeeling into Bhutan and also into the Indian States of Uttar Pradesh and Bihar. It represents the east-west-directed band of subtropical broadleaf forest at an altitude of between  along the Outer Himalayan Range, and includes several forest types traversing an east to west moisture gradient.

Geography
It forms a critical link in the chain of interconnected Himalayan ecosystems, where altitudinal connectivity between the habitat types is important for ecosystem function. The soil is composed of alluvium deposited over the ages by the rivers that drain this young mountain range.

At lower elevations, the ecoregion is flanked by the Terai-Duar savannas and grasslands. Above , it yields to the Himalayan subtropical pine forests.

Climate
The Himalayas capture moisture from the monsoons that sweep in from the Bay of Bengal, and most of this rainfall is expended in the eastern Himalayas.

Flora
The ecoregion hosts a broad range of plant communities, based on its complex topography, differing soils, and variations in rainfall from the drier west to the more humid east. Its location on the south slope of the Himalaya allows the intermingling of plants and animals from the Indomalayan and Palearctic biogeographic realms. The main forest types include Dodonaea scrub, subtropical dry evergreen forests of Olea cuspidata, northern dry mixed deciduous forests, dry Siwalik sal (Shorea robusta) forests, moist mixed deciduous forests, subtropical broadleaf wet hill forests, northern tropical semi-evergreen forests, and northern tropical wet evergreen forests.

Fauna
Several mammals native to the ecoregion are threatened, including the Bengal tiger, Indian elephant, smooth-coated otter, clouded leopard, gaur, Sumatran serow, Irrawaddy squirrel, and particoloured flying squirrel. The endemic golden langur is distributed in a small range and limited to the broadleaf forest north of the Brahmaputra River. The bird fauna is very rich with more than 340 species. The chestnut-breasted partridge is endemic; the globally threatened white-winged wood duck and five hornbill species are found here.

Protected areas
Eight protected areas extend into this ecoregion covering , which is about 7% of the ecoregion's area:
in India: Sohagi Barwa Sanctuary and Valmiki National Park;
in Nepal: Bardia National Park, Chitwan National Park, Parsa National Park;
in Bhutan: Royal Manas National Park, Khaling Wildlife Sanctuary and Phibsoo Wildlife Sanctuary.

Two high-priority tiger conservation units (TCU) extend across adjacent ecoregions:
Chitwan-Parsa-Valmiki TCU covers a  huge block of alluvial grasslands and subtropical moist deciduous forests;

External links

References

 
Ecoregions of Asia
Ecoregions of Bhutan
Ecoregions of the Himalayas
Ecoregions of India
Ecoregions of Nepal

Forests of India
Himalayan forests
Indomalayan ecoregions
Tropical and subtropical moist broadleaf forests
Forests of Nepal